WCIS-FM (105.1 MHz) is a Contemporary Christian radio station serving the Central New York Region. The station broadcasts with an ERP of 33 kW and is licensed to DeRuyter, New York; it is currently owned and operated by the Family Life Network, a regional Christian broadcaster active in upstate New York and Northern Pennsylvania.

History

WVCN
WCIS-FM began operating June 6, 1948 at 105.1 MHz  as WVCN, the Central New York outlet of the farm-oriented Rural Radio Network, a six-station group based in Ithaca.  This pioneer FM network was the first to employ a direct off-air relay system instead of wire lines, with WVCN serving as the link between Ithaca flagship station WVFC and sister stations WVBN, Turin (which would cease operation in 1951) and WVCV, Cherry Valley.  Its original General Electric 250 watt transmitter and four-section RCA FM Pylon antenna provided an ERP of 1.3 kW, horizontally-polarized.  A 1 kW amplifier was added in April, 1951, increasing ERP to 5.3 kW, however this proved insufficient to cover the entire city of Syracuse with a predicted 1 mV/m (60 dBμ) signal.

WRRD/WOIV
On January 1, 1954, the DeRuyter station's callsign was changed to WRRD.  After affiliating with New York City's WQXR, the group's programming began to shift toward classical music and a new identity as the "Northeast Radio Network" was introduced.  In January 1961, ownership of the DeRuyter facility and its four sister stations was transferred to the Ivy Broadcasting Company, Inc., prompting a callsign change to WOIV.  Five years later, the network changed hands again, this time to the Chenango & Unadilla (C&U) Telephone Company, which added a second 1 kW transmitter and a Collins/ERI model 300-5 dipole antenna to provide 4.9 kW in the vertical polarization.   A 1968 merger with Continental Telephone forced divestiture of C&U's broadcast properties, and the entire group of five FM stations, then valued at $600,000, was donated to the Christian Broadcasting Network, headed by Pat Robertson.

WVOA/WXBB/The Dog/Nova 105.1
CBN raised funds to replace aging transmitter equipment and eliminated the off-air relay system in favor of a stereo 950 MHz link from the main studio in Ithaca.  In September 1972, an RCA BTF-10E1 transmitter and BFC-10 circularly-polarized antenna were installed, increasing the ERP to 42 kW and greatly improving coverage in Syracuse.  In October 1981, CBN sold WOIV to Forus Communications for $242,500, and in 1989, the call sign was changed again to WVOA. Cram Communications, headed by Syracuse broadcast entrepreneur Craig Fox, operated the station under a religious format from 1994 to 2001, then sold it for $5 million to Clear Channel, which converted it to a simulcast of WBBS with the calls WXBB. After one year, it flipped to active rock as WWDG, "The Dog", in 2002, but after four years of struggling ratings, it flipped to "Nova 105.1," with a hot adult contemporary format, in July 2006. Clear Channel would later place the station in the Aloha Station Trust in 2008 due to the company's privatization plans.

Sale back to Craig Fox
On March 6, 2009, Craig Fox purchased the station back from Aloha, for only $1.25 million. The deal closed two months later, after which Fox and partner Samuel J. Furco temporarily took the station off the air.  FoxFur Communications restored the former WVOA call letters and brought the station back on the air on May 19, 2009 as WVOA-FM, and aired Catholic religious programming, simulcasting WVOU.

On August 14, 2009, WVOA-FM began stunting. The station started off simulcasting Radio Disney affiliate WOLF-AM.

Wolf 105-1

After just two weeks with the Radio Disney format, the station then began stunting with a loop of "Hungry Like the Wolf" by Duran Duran and then an all glam metal band format, before officially flipping at 4 PM on August 28, 2009 with a country music format, branded as "Wolf 105-1".

Trade with Family Life Network
In March 2016, as part of a multiple-station swap, the FM 105.1 license (along with 96.7) was traded to the Family Life Network in exchange for the FM 92.1 license in Baldwinsville (currently WOLF-FM, which is itself moving to FM 102.1). WOLF's intellectual property would move to 92.1, which provides a stronger signal over Syracuse proper. When the change is complete, 105.1 and 96.7 will change call signs (to WCIS-FM and WCIO respectively) and adopt FLN's Christian radio format. However on June 15, the Federal Communications Commission denied the trade and fined FoxFur and Wolf Radio $20,000 for violating the multiple ownership rule (because companies' owner Craig Fox illegally operated eight licenses, where ownership limits in the market are seven). The sale was reconfigured and approved by the FCC in September 2016, also reducing the fine to $16,000 in recognition of Fox's prompt correction of the error; the consummation of the sale occurred on August 21, 2017.

Repeaters and translators

References

External links
CNYRadio.com Station Wiki entry on WWDG

Radio stations in Syracuse, New York
Radio stations established in 1948
1948 establishments in New York (state)
Christian radio stations in New York (state)